Phaulernis is a genus of moths in the family Epermeniidae.

Species
Phaulernis africana Gaedike, 2013
Phaulernis chasanica Gaedike, 1993
Phaulernis dentella (Zeller, 1839) (originally in Aechmia)
Phaulernis fulviguttella (Zeller, 1839) (originally in Cataplectica)
Phaulernis laserinella J. Nel, 2003
Phaulernis montuosa Gaedike, 2013
Phaulernis pulchra Gaedike, 1993
Phaulernis rebeliella Gaedike, 1966
Phaulernis statariella (Heyden, 1863) (originally in Heydenia)

Former species
Phaulernis auromaculata (Frey, 1867) (originally in Oecophora)
Phaulernis laserpitiella (Pfaffenzeller, 1870) (originally in Heydenia)
Phaulernis monticola Inoue et al., 1982
Phaulernis silerinella (Rebel, 1916) (originally in Epermenia)
Phaulernis silerinella (Zeller, 1868) (originally in Heydenia)
Phaulernis subdentella (Stainton, 1849) (originally in Aechmia)

References

  & , 2005: Faunistics of the Epermeniidae from the former USSR (Epermeniidae). Nota Lepidopterologica, 28 (2): 123—138. Full article: .
  2013: New or poorly known Epermeniidae of the Afrotropis (Lepidoptera, Epermenioidea).  Beiträge zur Entomologie 63(1): 149-168. Abstract: 
 , 2006: Epermeniidae of Japan (Lepidoptera: Epermenioidea), with descriptions of six new species. Transactions of the Lepidopterological Society of Japan 57(1): 49-69. Abstract and full article: .
 , 2003: Description de quatre nouvelles espèces de Microlépidoptères découvertes dans le Midi de la France  (Lepidoptera, Tineidae, Gelechiidae,  Epermenidae). Revue Association Roussillonnaise d'Entomologie, 12 (2): 46-53.

Epermeniidae
Taxa named by Edward Meyrick